On April 20, 1824, Thomas J. Rogers (DR) of  resigned, leaving a vacancy which was filled by a special election on October 12, 1824, the same day as the general election for the 19th Congress.

Election results

Wolf ran unopposed.  He also won the same seat in the 19th Congress.

See also
List of special elections to the United States House of Representatives

References

Pennsylvania 1824 08
Pennsylvania 1824 08
1824 08
Pennsylvania 08
United States House of Representatives 08
United States House of Representatives 1824 08
Single-candidate elections